Germanville may refer to:

Germanville Township, Livingston County, Illinois
Germanville, Nebraska, a ghost town

See also
Ghermanville, Missouri